The Indian Branch Railway Company was formed in 1862 to build short branch and feeder lines. It received no guarantee but was offered a 20-year subsidy. In the 1850s, it secured a guaranteed return.

The Azimgan–Nalhati line was taken over by the Government in 1872, as Nalhati State Railway.

It established a railway workshop at Alambagh in 1865 and another at Charbagh in 1867.

Around 1872, it was merged into Oudh and Rohilkhand Railway. Oudh and Rohilkhand Railway was subsequently merged with East Indian Railway Company in 1925.

Conversion to broad gauge 
The railway lines were converted to  broad gauge in 2017.

References

4 ft gauge railways in India
Defunct railway companies of India
Rail transport in West Bengal
History of rail transport in Uttar Pradesh
Railway companies established in 1862
Indian companies established in 1862